Big Duck Ranch, also known as the Maurer Duck Farm, is a historic ranch located in Flanders, Suffolk County, New York. It operated as a duck ranch and retail store that sold duck products from 1936 to 1984.  The principal building on the site is the separately listed Big Duck.

It was added to the National Register of Historic Places in 2008 as part of plans to build a heritage park, picnic area, museum and rest stop. The Big Duck Ranch hosts various events, such as historic car shows, and is open year-round.

References

Agricultural buildings and structures on the National Register of Historic Places in New York (state)
Houses completed in 1937
Buildings and structures in Suffolk County, New York
National Register of Historic Places in Suffolk County, New York